Lynn D. Wardle is Bruce C. Hafen Professor of Law at the J. Reuben Clark Law School of Brigham Young University (BYU). He specializes in family law, constitutional law, and bioethics.

Wardle holds the Bruce C. Hafen Professorship at the J. Reuben Clark Law School. He has testified before congressional committees in favor of the Federal Marriage Amendment and the Defense of Marriage Act. In addition to opposing same-sex marriage, Wardle also opposes allowing same-sex couples to adopt children.

As a representative of the Church of Jesus Christ of Latter-day Saints (LDS Church), Wardle spoke to the World Congress of Families, an organization that opposes legal protections on the basis of sexual orientation, opposes same sex marriage, and supports policies against homosexuality in Russia, at its 1997 gathering in Prague at the 2007 WCF in Warsaw, and at the 2017 WCF in Budapest.

Wardle was the General Secretary of the International Society for Family Law (ISFL) and later its president. He remains on its Executive Council. He also edits the Society's web site.

Wardle received his bachelor's degree from BYU in 1971 and graduated cum laude  from Duke University Law School in 1974. He was a clerk for Judge John Sirica.

References

External links
 Lynn D. Wardle, "Seeing the Constitution as Covenant", Ensign, September 1989.

American Latter Day Saints
Utah lawyers
Brigham Young University alumni
Brigham Young University faculty
Duke University alumni
Living people
Family law scholars
1947 births